Löwenburg (German for 'lion castle') may refer to:

 Löwenburg, Pennsylvania, former name of Monaca, Pennsylvania, U.S.
 , hill in the Siebengebirge mountains of Germany
 Nivagl Castle, also called the Löwenburg, canton of Grisons, Switzerland
 , castle ruins near Bad Honnef, North Rhine-Westphalia, Germany
 Löwenburg (Bleicherode), castle ruins near Bleicherode, Thuringia, Germany
 , lost castle in Braunsbach, Baden-Württemberg, Germany
 , castle in Kassel, Hesse, Germany
 Löwenburg (Monreal), castle ruins near Monreal, Rhineland-Palatinate, Germany

See also 
 Loewenberg (disambiguation)
 Loewensberg, a surname
 Löwenberg, a town in Lower Silesian Voivodeship, Poland